Marceline Hugot is an American stage and screen actress. She is best known for her work in the films Working Girl, Julie & Julia, To Wong Foo Thanks for Everything, Julie Newmar, United 93; as well as her work on such television shows as Sex and the City, Ed, Onion News Network, The Leftovers, Godless, and most notably playing Kathy Geiss on the hit NBC sitcom 30 Rock.

Life and career
Marceline A. Hugot was born in Hartford, Connecticut, and had dual citizenship in both the US and France. Her father, Francois Hugot, was a professor of French studies at Brown University in Providence, Rhode Island. She began acting on College Hill, Providence, Rhode Island, as a freshman in college. While studying in San Diego for a master's degree in theatre, Hugot landed roles in films such as Working Girl and Woody Allen's Alice before moving to television with Ellen, ER, Law & Order, and Spin City. 

In the 2008 PBS film Jump at the Sun, directed by Sam Pollard, Hugot played 1940s radio personality Mary Margaret McBride opposite Kim Brockington's character Zora Neale Hurston. More recently, she starred as Shirley Hartland on AMC's Better Call Saul, Gretel on Fox's Gotham, and in the 2020 American black comedy thriller film Blow the Man Down alongside Annette O'Toole, June Squibb, and Margo Martindale.

On stage, Hugot performed in Eugene O'Neill's A Moon for the Misbegotten at the Actors Theatre of Louisville Victor Jory Theatre in Louisville, Kentucky. She also performed in Jackie Sibblies Drury’s Marys Seacole at Lincoln Center Theater’s LCT3 and as Aunt Dorothy in Craig Lucas's play Prelude to a Kiss in 2007 on Broadway at the American Airlines Theatre. Hugot is considered a character actress. "I'm the queen of cameos," says Hugot.

Filmography

Film

Television

Stage

References

External links
 
 
 Theater credits: Marceline Hugot
 Hugot portraying Mary Margaret McBride in "Jump at the Sun" PBS

Living people
20th-century American actresses
21st-century American actresses
American film actresses
American stage actresses
American television actresses
Actresses from Connecticut
People from Hartford, Connecticut
Year of birth missing (living people)